Gerrit van Bloclant (ca. 1578 – ca.  1650) was a Dutch Renaissance painter. 

Not much is known about Gerrit van Bloclant's life except through his works. His name suggest he may have come from the village of Blokland, South Holland or Blokland, Utrecht. He primarily painted still lifes of flowers, and displayed his skills in representing with exactness the colors, shapes and textures. The realism utilized helped contribute to botanical studies in the Netherlands. One work executed by Gerrit van Bloclant Flower-Piece is part of the National Inventory of Continental European Paintings collection.

References
 Gemar-Költzsch, Erika, Luca image lexicon: Dutch still life painter of the 17th century (2 vols.), Lingen: Luca (1995).
 Grimm, Claus, still life: The Dutch and German masters, Belser Verlag Stuttgart / Zurich (1988).
 Groenendijk, Pieter, Beknopt Biografisch Lexicon van Zuid- en Noord-Nederlandse schilders, graveurs, glasschilders, tapijtwevers etcetera van ca. 1350 tot ca. 1720, Leiden: Primavera (2008). 
 Meissner, Gunter, General Artists Encyclopedia of the visual artists of all times and peoples, part 11, Munich-Leipzig: Saur (1995).
 Van der Willigen, Adriaan & Meijer, Fred G., A Dictionary of Dutch and Flemish still-life painters working in oils, 1525–1725, Leiden: Primavera Press (2003).

1570s births
1650s deaths
Dutch Renaissance painters